Philip Meckseper, known professionally as Jr Blender (sometimes stylised as Jr. Blender or Junior Blender), is a German record producer and songwriter from Hamburg.

He is notable for his collaborations with American dance music group Major Lazer. His credits include the singles Lean On (with DJ Snake and MØ), Cold Water (with Justin Bieber and MØ), Run Up (with Nicki Minaj and PartyNextDoor), Light It Up (with Nyla and Fuse ODG) and All My Love (with Ariana Grande and Machel Montano).

Meckseper started his career as a member of the German sound clash group Supersonic. He came to the attention of Diplo during this time, thanks to remixes of tracks by Rihanna and Bruno Mars.

In addition to his pop music credentials, Meckseper has a history of collaborating with reggae and dancehall artists; acting either as a writer or producer, or both. To date, his reggae and dancehall credits include songs by Damian Marley, Sean Paul, Protoje, Chronixx, Gyptian, Lutan Fyah, Romain Virgo, Stylo G, Burro Banton, Exco Levi, Christopher Martin, Jah Vinci, Perfect Giddimani, Tony Rebel, Beenie Man and Luciano.

Songwriting and production credits

References

External links
BBC Music: Jr Blender

German record producers
German songwriters
Living people
Reggae record producers
Year of birth missing (living people)